The 1873 Stevens football team represented Stevens Institute of Technology in the 1873 college football season.

Schedule

References

Stevens
Stevens Tech Ducks football seasons
Stevens football